Clarion County Airport  is a public airport three miles northwest of Clarion, a borough in Clarion County, Pennsylvania. It is owned by the Clarion County Airport Authority.

The airport is on the Detroit Sectional chart. Fuel is provided by airBP; facilities include parking, hangars, passenger terminal and lounge, flight school, aircraft rentals, pilot supplies, telephone, wi-fi, a snooze room, and restrooms.

Most U.S. airports use the same three-letter location identifier for the FAA and IATA, but this airport is AXQ to the FAA and has no IATA code.

Facilities
Its one runway, 6/24, is 5,003 by 75 feet (1,525 x 23 m) asphalt.

In the year ending May 31, 2011 the airport had 12,727 aircraft operations, average 34 per day: 99.9% general aviation, <0.1% air taxi, and <0.1% military. 20 aircraft were then based at the airport: 85% single-engine, 5% helicopter and 10% ultralight.

References

External links 
 Aerial photo as of 11 April 1993 from USGS The National Map
 

Airports in Pennsylvania
County airports in Pennsylvania
Transportation buildings and structures in Clarion County, Pennsylvania